The 2012 Australia Open Grand Prix Gold was the third grand prix gold and grand prix tournament of the 2012 BWF Grand Prix Gold and Grand Prix. The tournament was held in Sydney Convention and Exhibition Centre, Sydney, Australia April 3 until April 8, 2012 and had a total purse of $120,000.

Men's singles

Seeds

  Chen Jin (champion)
  Sho Sasaki (semi-final)
  Simon Santoso (semi-final)
  Nguyen Tien Minh (final)
  Taufik Hidayat (quarter-final)
  Tommy Sugiarto (first round)
  Shon Wan-Ho (quarter-final)
  Wong Wing Ki (second round)
  Hu Yun (third round)
  Dionysius Hayom Rumbaka (withdrew)
  Ajay Jayaram (third round)
  Boonsak Ponsana (third round)
  Kashyap Parupalli (second round)
  Muhammad Hafiz Hashim (withdrew)
  Alamsyah Yunus (quarter-final)
  Hsueh Hsuan-Yi (second round)

Finals

Top half

Section 1

Section 2

Section 3

Section 4

Bottom half

Section 5

Section 6

Section 7

Section 8

Women's singles

Seeds

  Li Xuerui (withdrew)
  Cheng Shao-Chieh (first round)
  Sung Ji-Hyun (semi-final)
  Ratchanok Inthanon (second round)
  Bae Youn-Joo (final)
  Porntip Buranaprasertsuk (quarter-final)
  Tai Tzu-Ying (first round)
  Sayaka Sato (quarter-final)

Finals

Top half

Section 1

Section 2

Bottom half

Section 3

Section 4

Men's doubles

Seeds

  Mohammad Ahsan / Bona Septano (withdrew)
  Hirokatsu Hashimoto / Noriyasu Hirata (quarter-final)
  Fang Chieh-Min / Lee Sheng-Mu (final)
  Alvent Yulianto / Hendra Aprida Gunawan (quarter-final)
  Naoki Kawamae / Shoji Sato (quarter-final)
  Markis Kido / Hendra Setiawan (champion)
  Hiroyuki Endo / Kenichi Hayakawa (semi-final)
  Angga Pratama / Ryan Agung Saputra (semi-final)

Finals

Top half

Section 1

Section 2

Bottom half

Section 3

Section 4

Women's doubles

Seeds

  Miyuki Maeda / Satoko Suetsuna (semi-final)
  Shizuka Matsuo / Mami Naito (semi-final)
  Jung Kyung-Eun / Kim Ha-Na (second round)
  Greysia Polii / Meiliana Jauhari (second round)

Finals

Top half

Section 1

Section 2

Bottom half

Section 3

Section 4

Mixed doubles

Seeds

  Tontowi Ahmad / Lilyana Natsir (withdrew)
  Chen Hung-Ling / Cheng Wen-Hsing (champion)
  Chan Peng Soon / Goh Liu Ying (final)
  Sudket Prapakamol / Saralee Thoungthongkam (second round)
  Shintaro Ikeda / Reiko Shiota (semi-final)
  Muhammad Rijal / Debby Susanto (second round)
  Songphon Anugritayawon / Kunchala Voravichitchaikul (withdrew)
  Chris Adcock /  Imogen Bankier (withdrew)

Finals

Top half

Section 1

Section 2

Bottom half

Section 3

Section 4

References

Australian Open (badminton)
Australia
Badminton Australian Open
Australian Open